Lost Camp Creek is a stream in north-central Howell County in the Ozarks of southern Missouri. It is a tributary of the Eleven Point River.

The name of the stream relates to some person or group being lost in the area according to a variety of sources.

References

Rivers of Howell County, Missouri
Rivers of Missouri